Timothy Trent Hickel (born February 16, 1960) is an American lawyer and politician who served as a member of the Washington House of Representatives, representing the 30th district from 1995 to 1999. He is a member of the Republican Party.

References

Living people
1960 births
Republican Party members of the Washington House of Representatives
People from Federal Way, Washington
University of Washington alumni
20th-century American politicians